Puri is a city in Odisha, India.

Puri may also refer to:

Purí people, an extinct indigenous tribe that inhabited South America
Puri (food), an unleavened Indian bread

Places
Puri, Angola, a town and municipality in Uíge Province in Angola
Puri (Lok Sabha constituency), Odisha, India
Puri (Vidhan Sabha constituency), Odisha, India
Puri district, a district of Odisha, India
Puri, a palace in certain Bali kingdoms
Puri, East Java, a district in Mojokerto Regency, East Java, Indonesia
Puri, short for Puri Indah, a housing estate in Kembangan, Jakarta, Indonesia

People
Puri (surname), a Khatri surname
Eino Puri (born 1988), Estonian football player
Sander Puri (born 1988), Estonian football player
Puri Jagannadh (born 1966), Tollywood film director and producer
Puri Yáñez (born 1936), Spanish-born surrealist painter

See also
 Puri Puri (disambiguation)